Dulce Café is the name of a coffee shop/restaurant chain operating in South Africa. Originating in the city of Port Elizabeth, the company started as one small ice cream shop in 1980 and has now grown to 53 stores throughout the country.

The Dulce Café story

History

The Dulce Café story has its origins in Argentina when a young student by the name of Hubert Stempowski had his first taste of ice-cream in a parlour in Buenos Aires.

Hubert emigrated to South Africa in 1976 to complete his final year of study in engineering at Wits university. After holding a number of jobs in Johannesburg, Hubert dreamed of moving to the more relaxed coastal areas of South Africa.

In 1979, he finally decided to pack all his belongings into a van and head off to the coast – he picked East London as his preferred destination but after taking a wrong turn while driving at night he ended up in Port Elizabeth. Hubert ended up building up a large company from scratch, at its height employing over 110 people throughout the Eastern Cape; ice-cream however was always at the back of Hubert's mind.

Upon building up enough capital, Hubert immediately seized the opportunity to travel to Buenos Aires to learn the secret recipes of master ice-cream maker "Cacho", who was the owner of the "Confiteria OMS" in Palermo.

After a 3 months Hubert returned to South Africa with Marcelo, a young Argentinean ice cream apprentice.
 
He set about designing the concept and store with imported equipment arriving from Italy. His wife Cathy, an artist by trade designed the first logo and chose the name "Dulce" which in Spanish and Romanian means "Sweet".

Dulce Ice Cream opened for business in July 1981 in a small complex in Sydenham, Port Elizabeth.

New beginnings

In 2001, a management buyout was led by Mike Pullen, who became the majority shareholder of the company. The brand began to target niche markets such as hospital stores and growth occurred at a rapid rate.

In early 2013, Mike Pullen sold out his majority shareholding in Dulcé Café SA (to focus on the international market) to Kobus Wiese of Wiese Coffee Holdings.

International Agreements

In 2011 agreements were signed to expand the brand into East Africa, West Africa and the MENA territories. In Oct 2015, a master franchise agreement has been signed for India.

See also
 List of restaurants in South Africa

References

Restaurant chains in South Africa
Restaurant franchises
Coffee brands
Coffeehouses and cafés in South Africa
Multinational food companies
South African brands
Economy of the Eastern Cape
Port Elizabeth